The Douglas NO-2 was a 1920s proposal for a reconnaissance aircraft by Douglas.

Design
The NO-2 was intended to utilize a tractor engine, high wing configuration, with power coming from two Wright J-5 Whirlwind radial engines each delivering .

References

1920s United States military reconnaissance aircraft
NO-2